The Telaga Waja is a river which is situated in eastern Bali, Indonesia. It rises on the slope of Mount Abang and passes through towns and wilderness slopes along the region of Rendang Village, reaching the sea in Klungkung Regency.

Hydrology 

The Telaga Waja river is mainly located at the District of Rendang, Karangasem Regency, eastern part of Bali, the second in length after the Ayung River. The water comes from several springs in the mountains near Mount Agung, the highest mountain in Bali and considered holy by Hindu native people, such as Lipang, Arca and Telaga Waja springs. Also numerous smaller fountains flow into Telaga Waja, like the Yeh Sah River that sprung out of natural springs. The combination of tributaries and springs contributes to a high water debit, which is used by the local government for drinking water supply. Tourist attractions along the river are very popular, in particular, rafting.

Geography
The river flows in the eastern to the southeastern of Bali with predominantly tropical rainforest climate (designated as Af in the Köppen-Geiger climate classification). The annual average temperature in the area is 24 °C. The warmest month is October, when the average temperature is around 27 °C, and the coldest is January, at 22 °C. The average annual rainfall is 2123 mm. The wettest month is January, with an average of 569 mm rainfall, and the driest is September, with 23 mm rainfall.

See also 
 List of rivers of Bali
 List of rivers of Indonesia

References 

Rivers of Bali
Rivers of Indonesia